Harry Elkins Widener (January 3, 1885 – April 15, 1912) was an American businessman and bibliophile, and a member of the Widener family.

Biography

Born in Philadelphia, Pennsylvania, Widener was the son of George Dunton Widener (1861–1912) and Eleanor Elkins Widener, and the grandson of entrepreneur Peter A. B. Widener (1834–1915).  He attended The Hill School in Pottstown, Pennsylvania, and graduated from Harvard College in 1907, where he was a member of Hasty Pudding Theatricals and the Owl Club. Widener's godfather was the British banking magnate, Charles Mills, the 2nd Baron Hillingdon.

Along with his parents, in April 1912 Widener boarded the Titanic at Cherbourg, France bound for New York City. As the ship sank Widener's mother and her maid were rescued, but Widener, his father, and his father's valet perished. In 1915, Widener's mother donated the Harry Elkins Widener Memorial Library to Harvard in his memory. Two buildings at the Hill School are also dedicated to Widener, and stained glass windows at St. Paul's Episcopal Church, Elkins Park, Pennsylvania are dedicated to Widener and his father.

A Harvard legend holds that in order to spare others her son's fate, Widener's mother insisted (as a condition of her gift) that future Harvard graduates be required to learn to swim. However, while Harvard indeed implemented a swimming test in the 1920s (later dropped), this had nothing to do with Widener.

Book collecting
Widener was a member of the Grolier Club.
Book collector and dealer George Sidney Hellman, writing soon after Widener's death, commented on

Further reading

References

External links

"Harry Elkins Widener" at Harvard Magazine

1885 births
1912 deaths
Businesspeople from Philadelphia
Deaths on the RMS Titanic
American bibliophiles
American book and manuscript collectors
Harvard College alumni
Hasty Pudding alumni
People from Cheltenham, Pennsylvania
The Hill School alumni
Widener family